The Lettstädter Höhe is a mountain, 966 metres high, in the Central Black Forest in Germany, southwest of Kniebis.

The Lettstädter Höhe lies in a walking region on the Westweg trail from Pforzheim to Basle on the seventh stage between the Alexanderschanze and the Bergbauernhof Hark.

Mountains under 1000 metres
Mountains and hills of Baden-Württemberg
Mountains and hills of the Black Forest